Carl Boheman may refer to:

 Carl Henrik Boheman (1796–1868), Swedish entomologist
 Carl Adolf Boheman (1764–1831), Swedish mystic, Freemason, merchant and royal secretary